The 13th Los Angeles Film Critics Association Awards were announced on 19 December 1987 and given on 21 January 1988.

Winners
Best Picture:
Hope and Glory
Runner-up: The Last Emperor
Best Director:
John Boorman – Hope and Glory
Runner-up: James L. Brooks – Broadcast News
Best Actor (tie):
Steve Martin – Roxanne
Jack Nicholson – Ironweed and The Witches of Eastwick
Best Actress (tie):
Holly Hunter – Broadcast News
Sally Kirkland – Anna
Best Supporting Actor:
Morgan Freeman – Street Smart 
Runner-up: Sean Connery – The Untouchables
Best Supporting Actress:
Olympia Dukakis – Moonstruck
Runner-up: Vanessa Redgrave – Prick Up Your Ears
Best Screenplay:
John Boorman – Hope and Glory
Runner-up: John Patrick Shanley - Moonstruck
Best Cinematography:
Vittorio Storaro – The Last Emperor
Runner-up: Philippe Rousselot - Hope and Glory
Best Music Score:
David Byrne, Ryuichi Sakamoto and Cong Su – The Last Emperor
Runner-up: John Williams - The Witches of Eastwick
Best Foreign Film:
Au Revoir les Enfants • France/West Germany
Runner-up: My Life as a Dog (Mitt liv som hund) • Sweden
Experimental/Independent Film/Video Award:
Gus Van Sant – Mala Noche
New Generation Award:
Pedro Almodóvar – Law of Desire (La ley del deseo)
Career Achievement Award (tie):
Samuel Fuller
Joel McCrea
Special Citation:
Weapons of the Spirit

References

External links
13th Annual Los Angeles Film Critics Association Awards

1987
Los Angeles Film Critics Association Awards
Los Angeles Film Critics Association Awards
Los Angeles Film Critics Association Awards
Los Angeles Film Critics Association Awards